Court Building, Macau, is a former courthouse located at 459 Avenida da Praia Grande in Macau.

Built in 1951, the building was used as offices for the Portuguese colonial government, including the Judiciary Police Headquarters, and then as a courthouse. It has been designated as a structure of importance, and there are plans to convert it for use as the Macao Central Library.

See also
 Superior Court of Macau Building

References

Buildings and structures in Macau
Government buildings completed in 1951